State Route 445 (SR 445) is a  state highway in Washoe County, Nevada. The route follows Pyramid Way, a major thoroughfare in the city of Sparks, and connects the Reno metropolitan area to Pyramid Lake. The route is designated a Nevada Scenic Byway.

Route description

SR 445 begins at the intersection of Nugget Avenue and Pyramid Way in Sparks. From there, it passes under Interstate 80 directly to the north and skirts the eastern edge of Victorian Square in downtown Sparks as it continues heading almost due north.

Once outside of urban Sparks, SR 445 transitions to Pyramid Lake Road, more commonly referred to as Pyramid Highway. The rural highway is four lanes for a seven-mile stretch passing through Spanish Springs. The road narrows to two lanes entering the more sparsely populated Palamino Valley north to Pyramid Lake. As the road turns more sharply northeast, it enters the Pyramid Lake Indian Reservation. Shortly thereafter, the road curves northwest as it intersects State Route 446, following the western shore of Pyramid Lake. The highway passes through Sutcliffe and then comes to an end at Warrior Point Park Road, north of the town.

History
The first two miles (3 km) of State Route 445 in Sparks was originally designated State Route 32, with the remainder of the route comprising most of former State Route 33.  SR 445 was crafted from these routes in the Nevada highway renumbering that took place in the late 1970s.

 of the route (the entirety of the route within the Pyramid Lake Indian Reservation) became a Nevada Scenic Byway on June 27, 1996.  The same stretch was designated a National Scenic Byway on July 15 of that same year.

Future
The Pyramid Highway/U.S. 395 Connector (also known as the Northeast Connector) is a project taken by NDOT and RTC to improve mobility throughout the northern communities. The projects focuses on rerouting Pyramid Highway as a four to six-lane limited arterial roadway and freeway connecting U.S. 395 with an indirect connection to Sun Valley Boulevard, traveling along the mountainous region dividing Sun Valley with Sparks before merging with the original route. There is no set completion date, as it has not entered final design.

Major intersections

See also

References

445
Transportation in Washoe County, Nevada
445